XXXX Gold is a mid-strength Australian lager manufactured in the state of Queensland, Australia, by Castlemaine Perkins, and it is one of Australia's most popular beers. XXXX Gold is also produced in the Boag's Brewery in Launceston, Tasmania. XXXX Gold is a sponsor of the Queensland Bulls and the Queensland, South Australian, Australian Capital Territory and Northern Territory Cricket Associations. XXXX Gold previously sponsored the Australian V8 Supercars Championship Series from 2008 to 2011, as well as the Professional Bull Riders' (PBR) Australian branch. XXXX Gold has sponsored the Brisbane Lions since 2017 (shorts sponsor 2017–2018), and it remains one of the few active XXXX sponsorships.

History

Victoria Bitter has held the highest market share of all beer sold in Australia for more than two decades. However, in 2012, this mantle passed to the Lion Nathan's Queensland XXXX Gold. Lion Nathan passed the mantle back to Victoria Bitter in 2013. In March 2012, XXXX GOLD obtained a three-year lease on the  Pumpkin Island on the Southern Great Barrier Reef, which they turned into XXXX Island to use in advertising and promotional events. XXXX sponsored the XXXX Gold Beach Cricket Tri-Nations series, which involved famous cricket players from Australia, England and the West Indies such as Allan Border, Graham Gooch, Courtney Walsh and Sir Viv Richards.

See also

Australian pub
Beer in Australia
List of breweries in Australia

References

External links
xxxxgold site 
xxxxisland site 

Australian beer brands
Kirin Group
1991 establishments in Australia
Culture of Queensland
Products introduced in 1991